Sir Mangaldas Nathubhoy (15 October 1832 – 9 March 1890), Seth or head of the Kapol Bania caste, well known for their thrift and keen commercial instincts.

Biography 
He was born of a family whose ancestors emigrated from Diu Goghla district to Bombay soon after Bombay came into British possession. Ramdas Manordas, his grandfather, amassed a considerable fortune, which, owing to the premature death of his father, came into the sole possession of Mangaldas at the age of eleven. He had to take charge of the business in early life, though he gave some time to English studies. He was a noted cotton mill merchant and was agent of Bombay United Mill from 1860 to 1874, when he resigned and agency was given to Khatau Maccanji.

On the death of Nathubhoy's wife he established a dispensary at Kalyan in her memory and also a special female ward in connection with the David Sassoon hospital in Poona. As a merchant Mangaldas was upright and successful. In social matters he stood forth as a reformer, and to him the change to election from hereditary succession to the headship of the caste is due.

In 1862 he founded a fellowship in Bombay university to allow graduates to spend some years in Europe. A bequest in his will enabled the university to establish seven similar scholarships. He took keen interest in learning, and in such institutions as the Asiatic and geographical societies. In 1866 he was nominated to the legislative council and sat until 1874.

In 1867 he revived the Bombay association, a political body, over which he presided for a time. In 1872 he was made CSI, and in 1875 the dignity of Knight Bachelor was conferred on him. Besides a large donation to the Indian Famine Fund, Sir Mangaldas is known to have expended 500,000 on charities. He died at Bombay on 9 March 1890.

References

1832 births
1890 deaths
Knights Bachelor
Indian businesspeople in textiles
Businesspeople from Mumbai
Members of the Bombay Legislative Council
19th-century Indian philanthropists
Gujarati people
Gujaratis from Mumbai